This is a list of heads of state of Niger since the country gained independence from France in 1960 to the present day.

A total of ten people have served as head of state of Niger.

The current head of state of Niger is the President of the Republic Mohamed Bazoum, since 2 April 2021.

Titles
 1960–1974: President of the Republic
 1974–1989: President of the Supreme Military Council
 1989: President of the Supreme Council of National Orientation
 1989–1996: President of the Republic
 1996: Chairman of the National Salvation Council
 1996–1999: President of the Republic
 1999: Chairman of the National Reconciliation Council
 1999–2010: President of the Republic
 2010–2011: Chairman of the Supreme Council for the Restoration of Democracy
 2011–present: President of the Republic

Key
Political parties

Other factions

List of officeholders

Timeline

Latest election

See also
 Politics of Niger
 List of prime ministers of Niger
 List of colonial governors of Niger

References

External links
 World Statesmen – Niger

Niger
 
Political history of Niger
Politics of Niger
Heads of state